The Henley Boat Races were a series of annual rowing races between various crews representing the University of Oxford and the University of Cambridge.

The event included the Lightweight Men's Boat Race from 1975 to 2018, the Women's Boat Race from 1977 to 2014, the Lightweight Women's Boat Race from 1984 to 2019 and the Collegiate Boat Races from 2010 to 2019.  Between 2015 and 2020, the openweight and lightweight Varsity races previously held at Henley were relocated to the Championship Course to match the openweight men's Boat Race, at which point the Collegiate Boat Races were scrapped.

History
Henley Boat Races took place annually in late March or early April the week before the University Boat Races, which are held on the Championship Course on the Thames in London.

The Henley Boat Races began as men's lightweight races in 1975 and enlarged to incorporate the Women's Boat Race and their reserve crew race from 1977 and the women's lightweight race from 1984. In 2000, the lightweight men added a race for their reserve crews, Nephthys (Oxford) and Granta (Cambridge). The races took place in 2001, at the Holme Pierrepont National Watersports Centre in Nottingham. The lightweight men's race fell into abeyance after 2009 as a result of Cambridge not fielding a Granta crew from 2007, giving Oxford a row over for three years. From 2016, Nephthys and Granta raced again, sometimes on a different date or location to the main Henley Boat Races. A women's lightweight reserve race was held in 2012 prior to race day and took place from 2016 on race day. The 2013 event was moved to Dorney Lake as a result of flooding on the Thames.

In 2015, the Women's Boat Race moved further down the River Thames to the Tideway to take place as a combined men's and women's Boat Race. The event was moved to Dorney Lake again in 2018 due to "adverse river conditions on the Thames at Henley" and the collegiate races were cancelled. The Lightweight Men's Boat Race made the same move to the Tideway in 2019, followed by the Lightweight Women's Boat Race in 2020, although the Lightweight Boat Races continue to operate separately to their openweight counterparts.

The races received annual press coverage, and competitors from both Universities have gone on to compete at international and Olympic levels.

Events
Crews from the University of Oxford and University of Cambridge raced side by side over a 2000-meter course on the River Thames at Henley-on-Thames, racing downstream — the opposite direction to the Henley Royal Regatta course — and finishing halfway down Temple Island. The collegiate races took place over a shorter 1750 m course. The races typically included:
 Women's Boat Race (OUWBC vs CUWBC)
 Lightweight Men's Boat Race (OULRC vs CULRC)
 Lightweight Women's Boat Race (OUWLRC vs CUWBC Lightweights)
 Women's Reserves (Osiris vs Blondie)
 Lightweight Men's Reserves (Nephthys vs Granta) [held separately on an earlier date]
 Lightweight Women's Reserves (Tethys vs CUWBC Lightweight Reserves)
 Men's Intercollegiate Boat Race (between one college representing Oxford and one representing Cambridge)
 Women's Intercollegiate Boat Race (between one college representing Oxford and one representing Cambridge)

An Alumnae race was typically held in later years. The lightweight races constituted the varsity race. The first crew received university half-blues, and was therefore more commonly known as the Lightweight Blue Boat. The reserve crew received university colours. The intercollegiate races were between the fastest crews from the Oxford Torpids and the Cambridge Lent Bumps; Oxford selection being done by time trial  and Cambridge giving right of first refusal to headship crews.

Results

The history of the results of the races are as follows.

Women's Boat Race

The Women's Boat Race and its Reserve race became part of the Henley Boat Races in 1977. With the Women's Boat Race moving to the Tideway Championship Course and forming part of The Boat Races 2015, the race as well as the race of the reserve boats Osiris and Blondie ceased to be part of the Henley Boat Races. For the full results tables, see the main article on the Women's Boat Race.

Cambridge: 21 wins at Henley
Oxford: 17 wins at Henley

Notes

 – The course was shortened in 2007 due to rough water during the Henley Boat Races. It was reduced from 2000 m to less than 1500 m with the start between the Upper Thames Rowing Club and Old Blades.

Lightweight Men's Boat Race

Cambridge: 28 wins
Oxford: 16 wins

Lightweight Women's Boat Race

Cambridge: 19 wins
Oxford: 17 wins

Women's Reserves (Osiris vs Blondie)

Cambridge: 19 wins at Henley
Oxford: 19 wins at Henley

Lightweight Men's Reserves (Nephthys vs Granta)

Oxford: 9 wins
Cambridge: 4 wins

Lightweight Women's Reserves (Tethys vs CUWBC Lightweight Reserves) 

Cambridge: 4
Oxford: 1

Raced on the Friday before the main event in a 4+ in 2012, and incorporated into main race day in 2016.

Men's Collegiate Boat Race
Cambridge: 7
Oxford: 2

Women's Collegiate Boat Race
Cambridge: 5
Oxford: 4

References

External links
 Official website

Rowing at the University of Oxford
Rowing at the University of Cambridge
Sport in Oxfordshire
Boat Races
Recurring sporting events established in 1975
Women's rowing in the United Kingdom
Events in Oxfordshire
Annual sporting events in the United Kingdom
Annual events in England
1975 establishments in England